Ain't It Fun may refer to:

 "Ain't It Fun" (The Dead Boys song), a 1978 song, also recorded by Guns N' Roses, Rocket from the Tombs, and others
 "Ain't It Fun" (Paramore song), a 2013 song